Wolf Creek is a  long tributary to Slippery Rock Creek that rises from Pine Swamp in Mercer County and flows south to Butler County, Pennsylvania.  Wolf Creek drains the Borough of Grove City, Pennsylvania.

See also
 List of rivers of Pennsylvania

References

Rivers of Pennsylvania
Tributaries of the Beaver River
Rivers of Butler County, Pennsylvania